Eucalyptus hypostomatica, commonly known as Pokolbin box, is a species of erect, medium-sized to tall tree that is endemic to New South Wales. It has rough, flaky bark on the trunk and larger branches, lance-shaped adult leaves, flower buds in groups of seven, white flowers and barrel-shaped or conical fruit.

Description
It has rough, flaky or fibrous, dark grey bark on the trunk and larger branches, smooth grey bark above. Flowering occurs from October to November and the flowers are white.

Taxonomy and naming
Eucalyptus hypostomatica was first formally described in 1990 by Lawrie Johnson and Ken Hill in the journal Telopea. The specific epithet is from the ancient Greek hypo meaning "under" and stoma, referring to the stomates being mostly on the lower surface of the leaf.

Distribution and habitat
Pokolbin box grows in forest in isolated populations between the Pokolbin district, Kangaroo Valley and Widden Brook.

References

hypostomatica
Myrtales of Australia
Flora of New South Wales
Trees of Australia
Plants described in 1990
Taxa named by Lawrence Alexander Sidney Johnson
Taxa named by Ken Hill (botanist)